Saiyidah Aisyah Mohamed Rafa’ee (born April 20, 1988), commonly known as Saiyidah Aisyah, is a Singaporean rower. She placed 23rd in the women's single sculls event at the 2016 Summer Olympics, making her Singapore's first Olympic rower. She was forced to resort to crowdfunding to attend training for the event in Australia, before she received sponsorship from Singaporean fried chicken restaurant chain 4 Fingers Crispy Chicken.

Sporting Achievements
 2015 SEA Games, Women's Lightweight Single Sculls (LW1X) 1000m - Bronze
 2015 SEA Games, Women's Lightweight Single Sculls (LW1X) 500m - Bronze
 2013 Myanmar SEA Games, Women's Lightweight Single Sculls – Gold
 2011 Jakarta SEA Games, Women's Single Sculls – Bronze
 2011 Jakarta SEA Games, Women's Pair – Bronze
 2007 Jakarta SEA Games, Women's Lightweight Single Sculls – Bronze

References

External links 
 
 
 
 
 
 "There are no shortcuts to being an Olympian" - Athlete365 (article about Saiyidah Aisyah)

1988 births
Living people
Singaporean female rowers
Olympic rowers of Singapore
Rowers at the 2016 Summer Olympics
Rowers at the 2014 Asian Games
Southeast Asian Games bronze medalists for Singapore
Southeast Asian Games gold medalists for Singapore
Southeast Asian Games medalists in rowing
Competitors at the 2007 Southeast Asian Games
Competitors at the 2011 Southeast Asian Games
Competitors at the 2013 Southeast Asian Games
Asian Games competitors for Singapore
21st-century Singaporean women